Mount Hitchcock is a  mountain summit located west of the crest of the Sierra Nevada mountain range in Tulare County, California. Mt. Hitchcock ranks as the 112th highest summit in California.

History
In 1881, Rev. Frederick H. Wales of Tulare climbed nearby Mount Young, where he left a record of its name, and the name of the peak south of it, for which he suggested the name "Mount Hitchcock." This mountain's name was officially adopted in 1909 by the U.S. Board on Geographic Names to honor the eminent American geologist Charles Henry Hitchcock (1836–1919). Hitchcock was teaching at Dartmouth College while Wales was a Dartmouth student (1872 graduate). The first ascent of the summit was made in September 1881, by Frederick H. Wales via the west slope. During the same month, Wales also made the first ascent of Mount Kaweah. Wales Lake, three miles to the north of Hitchcock, was named after him.

Climate
According to the Köppen climate classification system, Mount Hitchcock has an alpine climate. Most weather fronts originate in the Pacific Ocean, and travel east toward the Sierra Nevada mountains. As fronts approach, they are forced upward by the peaks, causing them to drop their moisture in the form of rain or snowfall onto the range (orographic lift). Precipitation runoff from this mountain drains west to the Kern River via Whitney Creek.

See also

 Mount Chamberlin
 List of mountain peaks of California

Gallery

References

External links
 Weather forecast: Mount Hitchcock
 Mt. Hitchcock rock climbing: Mountainproject.com

Mountains of Tulare County, California
Mountains of Sequoia National Park
North American 4000 m summits
Mountains of Northern California
Sierra Nevada (United States)